Lermontov is a 1986 Soviet drama film directed by Nikolay Burlyaev.

Plot 
The film tells about the life and death of the great Russian poet Mikhail Lermontov.

Cast 
 Nikolay Burlyaev as Mikhail Yuryevich Lermontov
 Ivan Burlyaev as Mikhail Lermontov as a child (as Vanya Burlyayev)
 Vladimir Faibyshev as Mikhail Lermontov as a child (as Vova Faibyshev)
 Galina Belyaeva as Varvara Lopukhina
 Natalya Bondarchuk as Mariya Mikhailovna Lermontova, Mikhail's mother
 Boris Plotnikov as Yurii Petrovich Lermontov, Mikhail's father
 Inna Makarova as Elizaveta Alekseyevna Arsenyeva, Mikhail's grandmother
 Yury Moroz as Nikolai Martynov
 Sergei Smirnov as Svyatoslav Rayevskii
 Dmitriy Zolotukhin as Dmitrii Alekseyevich Stolypin, Mikhail's great-uncle

References

External links 
 

1986 films
1980s Russian-language films
Soviet drama films
1986 drama films